Paula Echevarría Colodrón (born 7 August 1977 in Candás, Carreño, Asturias, Spain) is a Spanish model and actress.

Career 
In the year 2000 she made her television debut on series such as Al salir de clase, Policías, and Compañeros. During that year she also worked as a reporter of the summer Telecinco news show Emisión Imposible.
 
In 2002 she participated as an actress on the Spanish version of Agatha Christie's mystery novel And Then There Were None.

In 2003 she was part of the cast of the television series London Street by Antena 3- and made an appearance in the movie Carmen by Vicente Aranda.

In 2004 she was part of the cast of the movie El chocolate del loro of Ernesto Martín and became part of the regular cast of the Telecinco's series El comisario. until the end of 2007.

In 2005 she made an appearance in the documentary Las locuras de Don Quijote.

In 2006 she was part of the main cast of the thriller Rojo intenso of Javier Elorrieta.

In 2007 she starred along with Álex González in the drama Luz de domingo of José Luis Garci. The film received 5 Premios Goya nominations from the Spanish film academy and was one of the three Spanish candidates for an Oscar Awards nomination.

In 2008 she worked again for José Luis Garci in Sangre de mayo. This film celebrated the bicentenary of the Dos de Mayo Uprising. It received seven Premios Goya nominations and was also one of the three Spanish candidates for an Oscar Awards.

From 2010 to 2013 she was one of the main characters on the TVE-1 series Gran Reserva, filmed in the Spanish region of Rioja about wine business and family feuds. Other actors included Ángela Molina and Emilio Gutiérrez Caba.

From 2010 to 2020 she had a diary blog on the Elle magazine website, called Tras la pista de Paula. She is the Spanish person with the highest number of followers on Instagram In 2012 she was the person with the highest growth in Google searches in Spain. In 2015 Echevarria was the most searched person on Bing in Spain for two consecutive years.

In 2012 she starred in Vulnerables by Miguel Cruz.

From 2014 to 2016 Echevarría was one of the main characters on Velvet, the prime-time series on Antena 3, together with Miguel Ángel Silvestre, Aitana Sánchez Gijón, Marta Hazas, José Sacristán, Amaia Salamanca, Manuela Velasco and Cecilia Freire. The series takes place at the end of the 1950s and is centered around the love between a seamstress and the wealthy heir of a department store.

In 2017 she filmed Ola de crímenes together with Juana Acosta and Maribel Verdú. The movie premiered on 5 October 2018.

Personal life 
On 22 July 2006 she married the Cantabrian singer David Bustamante in the Basílica de Santa María la Real de Covadonga in Asturias. On 17 August 2008, she gave birth to the couple's first child, a girl, whom they called Daniella Bustamante Echevarría. The couple divorced in March 2018.

Since March 2018, Paula Echevarría is in a relationship with the Spanish former football player Miguel Torres Gómez. In September 2020, she announced that she was pregnant with her second child. On 11 April 2021, she gave birth to her second child and first child with her partner, whom they called Miguel Torres Echevarría.

Filmography

Television

Television programs

Movies

Theater

Videoclips

Awards and nominations

References

External links 
 Paula Echevarría – Official Blog on ELLE
 

Actors from Asturias
1977 births
Living people
Spanish film actresses
Spanish television actresses
21st-century Spanish actresses
Association footballers' wives and girlfriends